Wachusett Reef was a phantom reef in the Antarctic Ocean.

Captain Lambert of the ship Wachusett reported that on June 4, 1899 he passed over a reef which appeared to be of coral formation in approximately latitude . The bottom showed of a dark gray color with deep blue on both sides of the reef.

Nevertheless, its existence is doubtful, making it a phantom reef. Other nearby historically reported reefs which appear to not exist include Ernest Legouve Reef, Jupiter Reef, and Maria Theresa Reef.

Notes

References

 Eade, J.V. (1976). Geological notes on the Southwest Pacific Basin in the area of Wachusett Reef and Maria Theresa Reef.  Wellington: New Zealand Oceanographic Institute.

Phantom islands
Reefs of the Pacific Ocean